Armin van Buuren: In The Mix  is a music video game for the Wii console. It was announced in May 2009 and was developed by TransGaming Technologies of Canada and published by Foreign Media Games (now Easy Interactive). The game was released in the United Kingdom on 12 November 2010.

Tracklist
 The Return – 8 Wonders
 Fine Without You (Original mix) – Armin van Buuren
 Going Wrong – Armin van Buuren
 Sail – Armin van Buuren
 Serenity – Armin van Buuren
 Zocalo (Zocalo in Mexico mix) – Armin van Buuren
 Communication – Armin van Buuren
 Imagine (Original mix) – Armin van Buuren
 Shivers (Alex M.O.R.P.H. Red Light Dub) – Armin van Buuren
 Rush Hour – Armin van Buuren
 Blue Fear (Original) – Armin van Buuren
 Love you More – Armin van Buuren
 Face To Face (Martin Roth remix) – Armin van Buuren
 If You Should Go (Aly & Fila remix) – Armin van Buuren
 Intruder – Armin van Buuren
 Intricacy (Thomas Bronzwaer remix) – Armin van Buuren
 Gaia – Tuvan
 Hold on To Me (John O'Callaghan remix) – Armin van Buuren feat. Audrey Gallagher
 Rain (Cosmic Gate remix) – Armin feat. Cathy Burton
 Never Say Never (Original mix) – Armin feat. Jacqueline Govaert
 Unforgivable (First State Smooth mix) – Armin feat. Jaren
 Fine Without You (Sied van Riel remix) – Armin feat. Jennifer Rene
 Burned With Desire (Rising Star mix) – Armin feat. Justine Suissa
 In And Out of Love (Richard Durand remix) – Armin feat. Sharon den Adel
 What If (Ohmna remix) – Armin feat. Vera Ostrova
 Dust in the Wind – Arnej
 Strangers we've become (Vocal mix) (Armada) – Arnej feat. Josie
 Washout – Bissen ft Crossover
 Hosoi (Simon & Shaker remix) – Blake Jarrell pres. Trasher
 You Never Said (Dash Berlin remix) – Cerf, Mitiska & Jaren
 Chinook – Dakota
 Man on the Run (Dash Berlin 4am mix) – Dash Berlin with Cerf, Mitiska & Jaren
 Love Always Fades (Michael De Kooker remix) – Dave Graham feat. Cat Martin
 Verano (Fast Distance mix) – DJ Shah & Fast Distance pres. Samara
 Biscayne – Elevation
 Copius Cain (Genix Re-Reub) – Genix
 Lover Summer (Orjan Nilsen remix) – Ilya Soloviev & Paul Miller
 Pyramid – John O Callaghan pres. Mannix
 New Jersey – Joint Operations Centre
 Fade 2 Black (W&W remix) – M6
 Mr. White – Marcos Schossow
 The New World (Original mix) – Markus Schulz
 Bittersweet Nightshade – Mike Foyle
 Vampire (Gareth Emery remix) – Myon & Shane 54 feat. Carrie Skipper
 The Sound of Goodbye – Perpetuous Dreamer
 Dust.Wav – Perpetuous Dreamer
 Back to the Essence (Ruben De Ronde remix) – Push
 Nothing at All – Rex Mundi & Susana
 Touch Me (Original Vocal mix) – Rising Star
 Stringer – Riva
 Body Lotion (Jorn van Deynhoven remix) – Roger Shah pres. Savannah
 Distant Signature (Alternate mix) – Signum
 Janeiro (Armin van Buuren remix) – Solid Sessions
 Lost – Sunlounger featuring Zara
 Beauty Hides in the Deep (The Blizzard remix) – The Doppler Effect
 Beyond The Stars – Thomas Bronzwaer
 Unexpectation (Denga & Manus remix) – Vengeance
 Carte Blanche – Veracocha
 Flowtation – Vincent de Moor
 Fly Away (Cosmic Gate remix) – Vincent de Moor
 Arena – W&W

References

External links 
 Official Web page
 GameSpot article

2010 video games
Europe-exclusive video games
Music video games
Video games based on musicians
Video games developed in Canada
Wii games
Wii-only games
Armin van Buuren